Bishop Lucey may refer to:
 Robert Emmet Lucey (1891–1977) Bishop of Amarillo and Archbishop of San Antonio
 Cornelius Lucey (1902–82) Bishop of Cork and Ross